Umga Sun Temple also known as a Umga Surya Mandir is a Hindu temple in Madanpur, Aurangabad Bihar.  The temple is  a  Sun shrine, dedicated to Lord Sun for Chhath Puja.  The temple is located in  Madanpur, Aurangabad in the Indian State of Bihar. Umga Sun Temple is a situated on Umga hills, Umga hills famous as a tourist place in Aurangabad Bihar. According to religious belief, After  Deo Sun Temple, Umga temple is second in important temples for Chhath Puja.

See also
Deo Sun Temple
Deo Fort
Deo Town
Chhath Puja

References 

Religious buildings and structures in Patna
Hindu temples in Bihar
Rebuilt buildings and structures in India